The 2000–01 National Football League, also known as the Coca-Cola National Football League for sponsorship reasons, was the fifth season of National Football League, the top Indian league for association football clubs, since its inception in 1996.

Overview
It was contested by 12 teams, and East Bengal won the championship. This was East Bengal's first title and the championship was decided on the last day. Mohan Bagan came second only by a point and Churchill Brothers came third. Air India and SBT (State Bank Of Travancore) were relegated from the National Football League.

League standings

References

External links 
 5th "Coca Cola" National Football League at Rec.Sport.Soccer Statistics Foundation

National Football League (India) seasons
1
India